Megasurf wireless internet os covering the area.

Africa

DRC

Mesh Bukavu

Pamoja Net

Ghana

Akwapim Community Wireless Network

Somalia

Abaarso

South Africa

Rural Telehealth

Orange Farm:

Zenzeleni:

Home of Compassion

Tanzania

Sengerema Wireless Community Network

Kenya

TunapandaNET Community Network

Tunisia

Mesh SAYADA

Asia
 Nepal Wireless Networking Project

Middle East

Oceania

Australia
 Air Stream Wireless
 Melbourne Wireless
 TasWireless, Tasmania

Europe

Austria
FunkFeuer

Belgium

Bulgaria

Croatia

Cyprus

Czechia

Denmark

Estonia

Finland

France

 Clermont Sans Fil

Germany
 Freifunk

Greece
 Athens Wireless Metropolitan Network
 Wireless Thessaloniki
 Sarantaporo.gr Wireless Community Network

Hungary

Ireland
CRCWN Cavan Rural Community Wireless Network. Free Wi-Fi and Fixed Wireless Internet.
(www.crcwn.online)

Italy
 ninux
 Progetto Neco

Latvia

Lithuania

Luxembourg

Malta

Netherlands
 Wireless Leiden

Poland

Hyperboria PL (hyperboria.net.pl)

Portugal
 Wirelesspt

Romania

Slovakia

Slovenia 
 wlan slovenija

Spain
 guifi.net

Sweden
 Pjodd

United Kingdom
 Southampton Open Wireless Network

America

North America

Canada

Nova Scotia
 Chebucto Community Network, Halifax Regional Municipality

Ontario
 Toronto Mesh
 Wireless Toronto
 Wireless Nomad, Ontario and Toronto

Québec
 Île Sans Fil, Montreal
 ZAP Sherbrooke, Sherbrooke

Cuba
 SNET (abbreviation of "Street Network"), nationwide underground community network

United States

Arizona
 Tucson Mesh, Tucson

California
 People's Open Network, Oakland

Illinois
 Champaign-Urbana Community Wireless Network

Minnesota
 Minneapolis wireless internet network

New York
NYC Mesh
Red Hook Wi-Fi

Oregon
 Personal Telco, Portland, OR

Vermont
 Newport Wireless Mesh, Newport City, Vermont

Washington
 Seattle Wireless

West Virginia
 West Virginia Broadband

South America

Argentina
 Altermundi

Brazil
 Coolab

See also
 Computer network
 Metropolitan area network
 Wireless community network
 Wireless mesh network
 Wireless user group

References

External links

Lists by region
Technology-related lists

da:Frie fællesskabs radionet
de:Freies Funknetz
fr:Réseaux sans fil communautaires